Tatar (also Romanized as Tātār) is a village in Badranlu Rural District, in the Central District of Bojnord County, North Khorasan Province, Iran. Its population was not reported in 2006 census.

References 

Populated places in Bojnord County